Ridley Hall is a theological college located on the corner of Sidgwick Avenue and Ridley Hall Road in Cambridge (United Kingdom), which trains men and women intending to take Holy Orders as deacon or priest of the Church of England, and members of the laity working with children and young people as lay pioneers and within a pastoral capacity such as lay chaplaincy.

History
Ridley Hall was founded in 1881 and named in memory of Nicholas Ridley, a leading Anglican theologian and martyr of the sixteenth century. The college's first principal was the theologian Handley Moule, later Bishop of Durham. It was founded under the same Deed of Trust as its sister college Wycliffe Hall, Oxford and to this day both colleges have the ability to nominate two members to the Hall Council of the other.

Present day
Ridley Hall offers several Common Award qualifications, validated by Durham University.  Although not  a constituent college of the University of Cambridge, the school has ties with the university's Faculty of Divinity.  Some students who are also in a constituent college of the university can be awarded qualifications by Cambridge. Ridley Hall forms part of the Cambridge Theological Federation, along with Westcott House, Westminster College, the Institute for Orthodox Christian Studies, and others.

Ridley Hall's teaching leans towards an evangelical theology. It is one of three Church of England theological colleges that self-identify as "Open Evangelical", the others being Trinity College in Bristol, and Cranmer Hall in Durham.

The current principal of Ridley Hall is Michael Volland. Volland succeeded Andrew Norman, who moved on to become Director of Ministry and Mission in the Diocese of Leeds.

It publishes an academic journal, Anvil.

Notable staff and alumni

Jonathan Bailey
Richard Bauckham
Jeremy Begbie
Edward Armstrong Bennett
Andrew Briggs
Arthur Buxton
Christopher John Cocksworth
Timothy Dudley-Smith
Dick Lucas
Michael Nazir-Ali
Mike Ovey
Gavin Peacock
John Sentamu
David Sheppard
John Stott
John Waine
David Watson
David Wenham
Andrew White

List of principals
Thus far, all the principals have been ordained Anglican clergy.
1881–1899 (res.): Handley Moule
1889–1907 (res.): Thomas Drury
1907–1927 (res.): Arthur Tait
1927–1945 (res.): Paul Gibson
1945–1950 (res.): Falkner Allison
1951–1963 (res.): Cyril Bowles
1963–1971 (res.): Michael Hennell
1971–1972 (res.): Francis Palmer
1973–1978 (res.): Keith Sutton
1978–1991 (res.): Hugo de Waal
1992–2001 (res.): Graham Cray
2001–2008 (res.): Christopher Cocksworth
2009–2016 (res.): Andrew Norman
2016–present: Michael Volland

References

External links 

Ridley Hall website
Cambridge Theological Federation website

 
Anglican seminaries and theological colleges
Evangelicalism in the Church of England
Institutions of the Cambridge Theological Federation
Anglican buildings and structures in Europe